The 1995 Copa dos Campeões Mundiais was the first competition realized in Brazil, between all the Brazilian clubs winners of the Intercontinental Cup.

Participants

First stage

Standings

Final

Champion

References

External links 

1995 in Brazilian football
Copa dos Campeões Mundiais